Andrei Pervozvanny (—St Andrew the First-Called) was an  predreadnought battleship built for the Imperial Russian Navy during the early-1900s. The ship's construction was greatly delayed by design changes as a result of the Russo-Japanese War and labor unrest after the 1905 Revolution, and she took nearly six years to build. Andrei Pervozvanny was not very active during World War I and her bored sailors joined the general mutiny of the Baltic Fleet in early 1917. She was used by the Bolsheviks to bombard the rebellious garrison of Fort Krasnaya Gorka in 1919 during the Russian Civil War and was torpedoed by British Coastal Motor Boats shortly afterwards, as part of the Allied intervention in the Russian Civil War. The ship was never fully repaired and was scrapped in 1923.

Description
The ship displaced  at deep load. The ship's crew consisted of 31 officers and 924 crewmen.

Twenty-five Belleville boilers provided steam to the engines.

The main armament of the Andrei Pervozvanny class consisted of two pairs of  Model 1895 guns mounted in twin-gun turrets fore and aft of the superstructure. Eight of the fourteen  Model 1905 guns were mounted in four twin-gun turret at the corners of the superstructure while six were mounted in casemates in the superstructure. For defense against torpedo boats, the ships carried twelve  guns mounted in casemates above the 8-inch guns in the superstructure. Two underwater  torpedo tubes were mounted, one on each broadside, and they were provided with six spare torpedoes.

Based on the Russian experience at the Battle of Tsushima, the sides of the ship's hull were completely protected by Krupp cemented armor.

Service history

Andrei Pervozvanny was built by the Admiralty Shipyard in Saint Petersburg. Construction began on 15 March 1904 and was officially laid down on 11 May. Her construction was slowed by labor trouble in the shipyard from the 1905 Revolution. She was launched on 30 October 1906 and began her sea trials in September 1910. They were completed in October 1910, but the ship entered service on 10 March 1911. Andrei Pervozvanny joined the Baltic Fleet on completion and she made a port visit to Copenhagen in September 1912. The following September she visited Portland, Cherbourg, and Stavanger together with her sister ship, . She ran aground on Odensholm Island, off the Estonian coast, on 1 July 1914. The ship was still under repair when World War I began the following month. Her lattice masts were cut down and light topmasts were added while under repair.

Andrei Pervozvanny was mostly inactive during the war as the Russian naval strategy in the Baltic was defensive and they did not intend to seek out the German fleet. She ran aground in the Longgayen Pass on 12 November 1914. She was refloated on 14 November, repaired and returned to service. Torpedo nets were fitted in early 1915 and the ship's torpedoes were removed in January 1916. In late 1916, four  anti-aircraft guns were added. The ship's crew joined the general mutiny of the Baltic Fleet in Helsinki on 16 March 1917, after they received word of the February Revolution in Saint Petersburg, and several of the ship's officers were murdered by the crew. The Treaty of Brest-Litovsk required the Soviets to evacuate their naval base at Helsinki in March 1918 or have their ships interned by newly independent Finland even though the Gulf of Finland was still frozen over. Andrei Pervozvanny and her sister ship the renamed Respublika, led the second group of ships on 5 April and reached Kronstadt five days later in what became known as the "Ice Voyage".

After the October Revolution in 1918, the ship remained on active duty as part of the Red Navy during the Russian Civil War. Between 13 and 15 June 1919, Andrei Pervozvanny and the dreadnought  bombarded Fort Krasnaya Gorka whose garrison had mutinied against the Bolsheviks. The ship fired 170 12-inch and 408 8-inch shells and the garrison surrendered on 17 June when Leon Trotsky promised them their lives, only to order them machine-gunned. Andrei Pervozvanny was attacked by the Royal Navy during its Campaign in the Baltic 1918–19, when she was torpedoed by either C.M.B. 31 or C.M.B. 88 during the night of 17/18 August 1919 as the ship lay at anchor in Kronstadt. She was hit on the port bow and settled  down by the bow. The British claimed three torpedo hits, but two of the torpedoes actually struck the harbor wall behind the battleship. The Victoria Cross, Britain's highest military decoration, was awarded to Commander Claude Congreve Dobson and Lieutenant Gordon Charles Steele for their successful attack. The ship was raised and docked, but never fully repaired. While under repair, she was nearly hit by a small bomb during a British air raid on 3 September. Scrapping of Andrei Pervozvanny began 15 December 1923, although she was not formally stricken until 21 November 1925.

Notes

Footnotes

References
 
 
 Melnikov, R. M. (2003, in Russian). Lineyny korabl "Andrey Pervozvanny" (1906–1925) (Линейный корабль "Андрей Первозванный" (1906–1925)). Saint Petersburg: Korabli i srazheniya. (no ISBN)

Further reading

External links
  Magazine article on the ship

Andrei Pervozvanny-class battleships
1906 ships
Ships built at Admiralty Shipyard
Maritime incidents in July 1914
Maritime incidents in November 1914